The Uniting Australia Party was a minor Australian political party that ran candidates in the 2013 federal election. During the campaign it attracted attention for thwarting Clive Palmer's attempts to name his party the "United Australia Party", since it had registered first and the names were too similar.

The party has been involved in Glenn Druery's Minor Party Alliance.

The party was deregistered by the Australian Electoral Commission in July 2015, after failing to respond to the AEC's notice to confirm eligibility for registration.

References

2013 establishments in Australia
2015 disestablishments in Australia
Defunct political parties in Australia
Political parties disestablished in 2015
Political parties established in 2013